Cyrus "Uncle Cy" Lovell (September 9, 1804April 9, 1895) was the Speaker of the Michigan House of Representatives from 1855 to 1856.

Early life 
Lovell was born on September 9, 1804 in Grafton, Vermont to parents Enos and Mary. In 1829, Lovell moved to Ann Arbor, Michigan. He later moved to Kalamazoo, Michigan, where he started his law career, and in 1832 built the first dwelling in Kalamazoo.

Career 
In 1836, Lovell moved to Ionia, Michigan and became the first supervisor of the county. Lovell was sworn in as a member of the Michigan House of Representatives on January 1, 1849 as a Whig. In 1855, and until 1856, served as the Speaker of the Michigan House of Representatives as a Republican. In 1850, he was a delegate to Michigan state constitutional convention.  He was the first Republican to do so. In 1860 and onward, Lovell was a Democrat, supporting Stephen A. Douglas' presidential run.

Personal life 
Lovell married Louise Fargo in Washtenaw County in 1831, and together they had at least two children.

Death 
Lovell died on April 9, 1895. Lovell was interred at Oak Hill Cemetery in Ionia, Michigan.

References 

1804 births
1895 deaths
Michigan lawyers
Speakers of the Michigan House of Representatives
Members of the Michigan House of Representatives
Michigan Democrats
Michigan Republicans
Michigan Whigs
Burials in Michigan
19th-century American politicians
19th-century American lawyers